Dr. Wayman C. Melvin House is a historic home located near Linden, Harnett County, North Carolina. It was built about 1890, and is a one-story Queen Anne style frame dwelling. It features a wraparound hipped-roof porch, shingled front-gable, and gable-front bay, all added in 1902. Also on the property are a contributing doctor's office (c. 1902) and cook's house/washhouse (c. 1902).

It was listed on the National Register of Historic Places in 2009.

References

Houses on the National Register of Historic Places in North Carolina
Queen Anne architecture in North Carolina
Houses completed in 1890
Houses in Harnett County, North Carolina
National Register of Historic Places in Harnett County, North Carolina